James Purdey & Sons, or simply Purdey, is a British gunmaker based in London, England specialising in high-end bespoke sporting shotguns and rifles. Purdey holds three Royal Warrants of appointment as gun and rifle makers to the British and other European royal families.

History

James Purdey founded James Purdey & Sons in London, England in 1814, locating his business on Princes Street.

Prior to starting out on his own, Purdey worked as head stocker for Joseph Manton, the foremost gunmaker of his time. In 1826 the company moved from the Princes Street location to Manton's former premises in Oxford Street.

The founder's son, James Purdey the Younger, took over the running of the company from his father in 1858. James the Younger saw rapid change in the development and design of guns and rifles during his lifetime, essentially moving from muzzle loading flintlocks in the 1820s to breech loading hammerless ejectors by the 1880s. James the Younger was always at the forefront of advances in the design and building of his guns and rifles, and took out several patents for technical innovations over the years. Many of James the Younger's patents were adopted by other gunmakers.

In 1882 the company moved from Oxford Street to new premises on the corner of South Audley Street and Mount Street, where the company remains to this day. James the younger designed this building to accommodate his showroom, the factory, and later the building provided living quarters for James' family. The City of Westminster unveiled a memorial plaque on the shop at 57-60 South Audley Street on 30 April 1992.

Purdey guns moved briskly from flintlock to percussion cap to hammer centre-fire guns and then to the self-opening hammerless gun of 1880. This hammerless self opening mechanism was designed by Frederick Beesley, a Purdey worker of the time, and used one limb of a V spring to operate the internal hammers and the other to operate the self opening feature. Beesley sold the patent to Purdey in 1880 for £55. This was followed ten years later by the incorporation of ejectors. Apart from continual refinement and the optional single trigger mechanism, very little change has subsequently been made to the design of the side-by-side gun.

In 1900 Athol Purdey took over from his father and ran the business through the prosperous Edwardian years, as well as supervising Purdey's manufacturing of gun parts and other items of ordnance for the War Department during World War I. Athol's sons, James and Tom, both of whom had survived serious injuries whilst fighting in France, joined the firm in the 1920s, and took over from Athol Purdey on his retirement circa 1929.

The Purdey "over & under" gun is a development of the Woodward patent of 1913 which was incorporated into the company on the purchase of J.Woodward & Sons by Purdey in 1949.

Whilst James Purdey & Sons is best known as a maker of shotguns, it also produces rifles, both double-barrelled and bolt-action. The guns are custom-made, largely by hand. They are extremely expensive.

Richard Purdey, the sixth generation of the family from the founder, retired as chairman in February 2007. Nigel Beaumont took over as chairman until his retirement in 2014. James Horne was chairman from 2014 to December 2019. The current Chairman is Dan Jago.

Ownership changes
In 1946, after 132 years of Purdey family ownership, Hugh Seely, 1st Baron Sherwood, purchased James Purdey & Sons Ltd. In 1994, The Hon Richard Beaumont, who had been chairman since 1970, upon deciding to retire, sold James Purdey & Sons Ltd to Compagnie Financière Richemont SA.

Royal clientele
As early as 1838, Queen Victoria is recorded as having bought a pair of Purdey pistols. During the nineteenth and early twentieth centuries the company supplied ornate guns and rifles to various Indian princes.

Warrants
The company was granted its first Royal Warrant in 1868 by The Prince of Wales, later King Edward VII; today the company holds warrants from King Charles III.

The company also held warrant from The Duke of Edinburgh and Queen Elizabeth II until their deaths in 2021 and 2022.

References

External links 
 

Richemont brands
British Royal Warrant holders
Shotguns
Firearm manufacturers of the United Kingdom
Manufacturing companies established in 1814
1814 establishments in England
British companies established in 1814
Mount Street, London